Lauren Arnell (born 15 March 1987) is a retired Australian rules footballer and senior coach of the Port Adelaide Football Club in the AFL Women's competition, having previously played for Carlton and the Brisbane Lions. She served as Carlton's inaugural AFLW team captain in the 2017 season and won the 2021 premiership with the Brisbane Lions, before becoming 's inaugural coach in 2022.

Early life and state league football
Arnell played just one football match as a junior, in a school tournament in her last year of primary school. A talented state-level junior basketballer, Arnell next played football in 2005 while studying to be a teacher in Ballarat.

Arnell first played football competitively for North Ballarat before moving to the Darebin Falcons in the Victorian Women's Football League (VWFL) where she would win nine league premierships through the end of 2016.

In 2010, Arnell was selected as one of forty players to participate in the women's AFL high-performance camp.

She has represented Victoria at the AFL Women's National Championship on six occasions and been selected three times as an All-Australian.

She played for the club in exhibition series matches through the end of 2016.

Playing career

Carlton
Arnell was signed as a priority player by Carlton in August 2016 ahead of the league's inaugural 2017 season. She had previously worked at the club in an off-field role, including in the development of Carlton's bid for a women's team licence. She was named the club's inaugural AFL Women's captain in January 2017. She made her debut in round 1, 2017, in the club and the league's inaugural match at Princes Park against .

Carlton signed Arnell for the 2018 season during the trade period in May 2017. She was replaced as captain by Brianna Davey in 2018, instead taking on the role of co-vice captain that season.

Brisbane
On 28 May 2018, Arnell moved to Brisbane in  a three-way deal in which Carlton received pick 40 and Collingwood received Nicole Hildebrand. Ahead of the 2021 AFL Women's season, Arnell made the decision to retire at the end of the season, a decision she announced in April 2021, following Brisbane's 18-point victory over Adelaide to claim the premiership.

Coaching career

Port Adelaide
Arnell was appointed as the inaugural coach of 's AFLW side in April 2022, making her the first former AFLW player to become a senior coach.

Statistics
 Statistics are correct to the end of the 2018 season

|- style="background-color: #eaeaea"
! scope="row" style="text-align:center" | 2017
|
| 13 || 7 || 2 || 2 || 60 || 24 || 84 || 11 || 26 || 0.3 || 0.3 || 8.6 || 3.4 || 12.0 || 1.6 || 3.7
|- 
! scope="row" style="text-align:center" | 2018
|
| 13 || 4 || 2 || 1 || 21 || 6 || 27 || 7 || 10 || 0.5 || 0.3 || 5.3 || 1.5 || 6.8 || 1.8 || 2.5
|- style="background-color: #eaeaea"
! scope="row" style="text-align:center" | 2019
|
| 16 || 7 || 0 || 0 || 58 || 30 || 88 || 15 || 32 || 0.0 || 0.0 || 8.3 || 4.3 || 12.6 || 2.1 || 4.6
|- 
! scope="row" style="text-align:center" | 2020
|
| 16 || 7 || 2 || 3 || 49 || 31 || 80 || 16 || 17 || 0.3 || 0.4 || 7.0 || 4.4 || 11.4 || 2.3 || 2.4
|- style="background-color: #eaeaea"
! scope="row" style="text-align:center" | 2021
|
| 16 || 11 || 3 || 4 || 91 || 39 || 130 || 26 || 31 || 0.3 || 0.4 || 8.3 || 3.5 || 11.8 || 2.4 || 2.8
|- class="sortbottom"
! colspan=3| Career
! 36
! 9
! 10
! 279
! 130
! 409
! 75
! 116
! 0.3
! 0.3
! 7.8
! 3.6
! 11.4
! 2.1
! 3.2
|}

Personal life
Arnell grew up on a cattle farm in the Victorian town of Clarkefield, 46 kilometres northwest of Melbourne. She spent her later teenage years in Lakes Entrance in the state's east. She is one of a set of triplets.

Arnell studied physical education teaching at the University of Ballarat and has previously worked as a school teacher.

She is the niece of former  player, Ray Walker.

Off-field Arnell works as AFL Victoria's education and training manager.

References

External links

Living people
1987 births
Carlton Football Club (AFLW) players
Australian rules footballers from Victoria (Australia)
Sportswomen from Victoria (Australia)
Australian schoolteachers
Brisbane Lions (AFLW) players
Darebin Falcons players